Trinity Cathedral is located in Downtown Omaha, Nebraska. Nebraska's first Episcopal parish, Trinity was established in 1856, and became the state's first Episcopal cathedral in 1872. Designed by noted English architect Henry G. Harrison in 1880, the cathedral was consecrated on November 15, 1883. It was added to the National Register of Historic Places in 1974. Today Trinity Cathedral is considered one of the most beautiful churches in Omaha.

History 

Trinity was begun organized by the Right Reverend David Jackson Kemper on July 13, 1856. The first church was built at South Ninth and Farnam Streets. The congregation lost control of the first church building in 1864; the second building was lost to fire in 1868. The third church was built the next year, and was used until the cathedral was constructed. The Right Reverend Robert Harper Clarkson broke ground for the new cathedral, later laying the cornerstone on May 25, 1880. The cost of the cathedral was about $100,000 by the time it was completed three years later.

The church served as the base of many Episcopal missions to areas of the western United States. It is the episcopal seat of the Bishop of the Episcopal Diocese of Nebraska.

Design 
It is built in the late Late Gothic Revival style, with rock-faced masonry walls and stone tracery over more than 43 stained glass lancet windows. The church is almost entirely of bluestone from Illinois, in a design that is nearly cruciform with an entry tower extending outward. The exterior of the building has more than six stone crosses at varying points of its roof line. Its design was influenced by the Oxford Movement in the Episcopal church, which led to a revival of medieval styles, as well as an interest in historic design at the time in United States architecture.

The interior features Gothic design throughout, including aisles, nave, transept, choir, and a clerestory. The church includes a noted carved oak bishop's throne and dean's stall.

See also
List of the Episcopal cathedrals of the United States
List of cathedrals in the United States

References

External links 

 Trinity Cathedral official website.
  at the Nebraska State Historical Society. Retrieved on May 21, 2010.
 Historic postcards Nebraska Memories

National Register of Historic Places in Omaha, Nebraska
Episcopal cathedrals in the United States
History of Downtown Omaha, Nebraska
Episcopal church buildings in Nebraska
Churches in Omaha, Nebraska
Churches on the National Register of Historic Places in Nebraska
Religious organizations established in 1856
Churches completed in 1883
19th-century Episcopal church buildings
1856 establishments in Nebraska Territory